Mark Slessinger (born May 2, 1974) is the current basketball head coach at the University of New Orleans. Before becoming coach at UNO, Slessinger spent the previous 11 years as an assistant coach at Northwestern State University in Natchitoches, Louisiana. During Slessinger's tenure, the team won two Southland Conference titles and went to the NCAA Tournament twice, posting a record of 2–2 in the tournament.

Prior to joining Northwestern State, Slessinger served as the head coach at Northland Pioneer Community College in Arizona, posting a 36–25 record.  Slessinger started his career with a pair of one-year stints at Aurora University (IL) and Central Michigan.

He is a member of Sigma Lambda Beta fraternity. He graduated from Edgewood High School in Ellettsville, Indiana where he played basketball for the Mustangs.

University of New Orleans 
Slessinger became the 12th head coach in the history of the New Orleans program on June 28, 2011. With Slessinger at the helm, the Privateers re-integrated into full time Division I status for athletics, despite budget challenges following Hurricane Katrina. In 2013-14 New Orleans became a member of the Southland Conference, and in just its fourth full season, won both the regular season championship and conference tournament championship in 2016–17.

With the conference tournament championship in March 2017, Slessinger ended a 21-year NCAA tournament drought and earned the program's first NCAA berth since 1996. In addition to the NCAA tournament appearance, Slessinger also received several individual awards for the 2016–17 season. Slessinger was named the Southland Conference Coach of the Year. The award was voted on by other conference head coaches after New Orleans was the preseason 9th place pick and then won the conference outright with a 13–5 record. Slessinger also received the prestigious Eddie Robinson Award in the summer of 2017. The award is sponsored by the New Orleans Sports Hall of Fame and recognizes outstanding achievements in athletics, academics, and citizenship to a member of the Louisiana sports community. Slessinger was also named Coach of the Year by the Louisiana Writers' Association and the Louisiana Basketball Coaches Association. Following the season, he received a new seven-year contract with the team.

During Slessinger's time on the Lakefront, the Privateers have had a 95% graduation rate and helped numerous players continue their playing careers professionally. Slessinger resides in New Orleans with his wife and children.

Head coaching record

College

References

1974 births
Living people
American men's basketball coaches
American men's basketball players
Aurora Spartans men's basketball coaches
Aurora Spartans men's basketball players
Basketball coaches from Indiana
Basketball players from Indiana
Central Michigan Chippewas men's basketball coaches
College men's basketball head coaches in the United States
Junior college men's basketball coaches in the United States
New Orleans Privateers men's basketball coaches
Northwestern State Demons basketball coaches
Point guards
Sportspeople from Bloomington, Indiana